Minnesota State Highway 287 (MN 287) is a  highway in west-central Minnesota, which runs from its intersection with State Highway 28 in Grey Eagle and continues north to its northern terminus at its intersection with U.S. 71 / State Highway 27 in Long Prairie.

Route description
Highway 287 serves as a north–south route in west-central Minnesota between Grey Eagle and Long Prairie.

The roadway passes around the south side of Trace Lake at Grey Eagle. It also passes around the west side of Big Swan Lake in Burnhamville Township.

Highway 287 changes direction to east–west at its intersection with Todd County Road 13 in Round Prairie Township; and continues as east–west for 2.5 miles before returning again to a north–south direction for the remainder of its route towards Long Prairie.

Highway 287 is also known as State Street West in Grey Eagle.  The route follows 4th Avenue SE in Long Prairie.

The route is legally defined as Route 287 in the Minnesota Statutes.

History
Highway 287 was authorized on July 1, 1949.

The route was paved from Grey Eagle to Big Swan Lake in 1952. The remainder was paved in 1954 or 1955.

Major intersections

References

External links

Highway 287 at the Unofficial Minnesota Highways Page

287
Transportation in Todd County, Minnesota